Francesco Ramírez, O.P. (14 February 1648 – 27 August 1715) was a Roman Catholic prelate who served as Archbishop (Personal Title) of Agrigento (1697–1715) and Archbishop of Brindisi (1689–1697).

Biography
Francesco Ramírez was born in Estremera, Spain on 14 February 1648 and ordained a priest in the Order of Preachers.

On 28 February 1689, he was appointed during the papacy of Pope Innocent XI as Archbishop of Brindisi.
On 6 March 1689, he was consecrated bishop by Galeazzo Marescotti, Cardinal-Priest of Santi Quirico e Giulitta, with Alberto Mugiasca, Bishop of Alessandria della Paglia, and Alberto Sebastiano Botti, Bishop of Albenga, serving as co-consecrators. 
On 26 August 1697, he was appointed during the papacy of Pope Innocent XII as Archbishop (Personal Title) of Agrigento.
He served as Bishop of Agrigento until his death on 27 August 1715.

References

External links and additional sources
 (for Chronology of Bishops) 
 (for Chronology of Bishops) 
 (for Chronology of Bishops) 
 (for Chronology of Bishops) 

17th-century Italian Roman Catholic archbishops
Bishops appointed by Pope Innocent XI
Bishops appointed by Pope Innocent XII
1648 births
1715 deaths
Dominican bishops